Olasiti is an administrative ward in the Arusha City Council located in the Arusha Region of Tanzania. According to the 2012 census, the ward has a total population of 36,361.

References

Wards of Arusha City
Wards of Arusha Region